Thomas Harvey Ransom (August 8, 1870 – June 3, 1946) was an American football and basketball coach and a doctor.

Career 
Ransom was the head football coach at Michigan State Normal College—now known as Eastern Michigan University—in Ypsilanti, Michigan, serving for the 1914 season, and compiling a record of 3–2–1.  He was also the head basketball coach at Michigan State Normal for the 1914–15 season, tallying a mark of 9–4.

Ransom, who had an M.D., resided at 950 Sheridan Street in Ypsilanti when he worked at the university. He had previously resided at Bloomingdale, where he was one of the first citizens to own a car. In addition to having the position as instructor in Physical Education, Ransom was also a health inspector at the school.

Personal life 
Born in Grant County, Indiana in 1870, Ransom married Nelle Pearl Wiggins on April 2, 1902.  He died on June 3, 1946 in California.

Head coaching record

Football

Basketball

References

External links
 

1870 births
1946 deaths
20th-century American physicians
Eastern Michigan Eagles football coaches
Eastern Michigan Eagles men's basketball coaches
People from Grant County, Indiana
People from Van Buren County, Michigan
Physicians from Michigan